Drillia diasi is a species of sea snail, a marine gastropod mollusk in the family Drilliidae.

Description

 
The creamy white shell consists of calcium carbonates and unusually for shelled animals contains little to no chitin. It attains the length 9 mm and the diameter 3.75 mm. This animal is carnivorous, has only one gill and one kidney and lacks a brain.

Distribution
This marine species occurs in the demersal zone of the Atlantic Ocean off South Africa.

References

  Barnard K.H. (1958), Contribution to the knowledge of South African marine Mollusca. Part 1. Gastropoda; Prosobranchiata: Toxoglossa; Annals of The South African Museum v. 44 pp. 73–163
  Tucker, J.K. 2004 Catalog of recent and fossil turrids (Mollusca: Gastropoda). Zootaxa 682:1–1295

Endemic fauna of South Africa
diasi
Gastropods described in 1958